Avril Lennox (born 26 April 1956) is a British gymnast. She competed at the 1972 Summer Olympics and the 1976 Summer Olympics.

References

1956 births
Living people
British female artistic gymnasts
Olympic gymnasts of Great Britain
Gymnasts at the 1972 Summer Olympics
Gymnasts at the 1976 Summer Olympics
Sportspeople from Leicester